FijiFirst is a liberal political party in Fiji. The party was formed in March 2014 by then Prime Minister, Frank Bainimarama.

Formation
The party was launched on 31 March 2014 with Bainimarama beginning a nationwide tour of the country in a campaign bus to collect the obligatory 5000 signatures necessary to register a political party. 
The party collected over 40,000 signatures for its registration.

Bainimarama says FijiFirst is a name that encompasses his political beliefs.
He listed his first candidate and party president Jiko Luveni.

The party appointed former Fiji Labour Party senator Bijai Prasad as one of its Vice Presidents as well as the current Attorney General Aiyaz Sayed-Khaiyum as the party General secretary. Bijai Prasad resigned as VP a day later citing a criminal conviction for larceny in the 1980s for which he had served jail time. The Tui Macuata, Ratu Wiliame Katonivere was also selected as a vice president of the party. Vimlesh Kumar who is an accountant and an affiliate member of CPA Australia is listed as the treasurer.

The party's application for registration resulted in six complaints, including one claiming that "Fiji 1st" was previously used by another party. Despite this, the party was registered on 30 May 2014.

2014 election
The party released its first batch of 21 candidates on July 25, 2014 with Frank Bainimarama heading the list. As a result of the 2014 Fijian general elections, the party won 293,714 votes, 59.2% of all those who voted (495,105 voters), giving the party a clear majority with 32 of the 50 Parliamentary seats.

2018 election
The party ran 51 candidates in the 2018 elections, ten of which were women. FijiFirst won the 2018 general elections with a reduced majority from the 2014 elections. FijiFirst accumulated 227,241 of the votes that resulted on the party gaining 50.02% that allocated to 27 seats enough for the party to govern alone within a slim majority.

2022 election
Despite remaining the first party in the 2022 election FijiFirst saw its vote share reducing again down to 42.55%, causing the party to lose its majority in the Parliament. With only 3 seats the SODELPA emerged as kingmaker, and after 6 days of negotiations it decided to support a PAP-led cabinet, effectively ending FijiFirst's eight-year tenure and Bainimarama's 16-year premiership.

Electoral history

Parliamentary elections

References

External links
Official website

2014 establishments in Fiji
Political parties established in 2014
Political parties in Fiji
Social liberal parties
Populist parties